"" ( German for "love death") is the title of the final, dramatic music from the 1859 opera  by Richard Wagner. It is the climactic end of the opera, as Isolde sings over Tristan's dead body.

The music is often used in film and television productions of doomed lovers.

Partial text

References

Further reading
 Bronfen, Elisabeth, Liebestod und Femme fatale. Der Austausch sozialer Energien zwischen Oper, Literatur und Film, Frankfurt am Main: Suhrkamp 2004.

External links

Full text and some performances
, Birgit Nilsson

Literary terminology
Compositions by Richard Wagner
Opera excerpts
Arias in German
Death in art
1859 compositions